The Men's and Women's Volleyball Competition at the 2007 All-Africa Games were held in Algiers, Algeria from 14 July to 22 July 2007.

Men's competition

Group A

Group B

Final round
July 21 — Semi Finals

July 22 — Bronze Medal Match

July 22 — Gold Medal Match

Women's competition

Group A

Group B

Final round
July 21 — Semi Finals

July 22 — Bronze Medal Match

July 22 — Gold Medal Match

References
https://web.archive.org/web/20070704022901/http://www.coja2007.dz/
https://web.archive.org/web/20070909073313/http://www.cavb.org/2007_Africa_Games/Algeria.html

Volleyball at the African Games
A
2007 All-Africa Games